USS Lamson (DD-328) was a  built for the United States Navy during World War I.

Description
The Clemson class was a repeat of the preceding  although more fuel capacity was added. They had a crew of 6 officers and 108 enlisted men.

Performance differed radically between the ships of the class, often due to poor workmanship. The Clemson class was powered by two steam turbines, each driving one propeller shaft, using steam provided by four water-tube boilers.

The ships were armed with four 4-inch (102 mm) guns in single mounts and were fitted with two  1-pounder guns for anti-aircraft defense. In many ships a shortage of 1-pounders caused them to be replaced by 3-inch (76 mm) guns. Their primary weapon, though, was their torpedo battery of a dozen 21 inch (533 mm) torpedo tubes in four triple mounts. They also carried a pair of depth charge rails. A "Y-gun" depth charge thrower was added to many ships.

Construction and career
Lamson, named for American Civil War naval hero Roswell Lamson, was laid down 13 August 1919 by Bethlehem Shipbuilding Corporation, San Francisco, California; launched 1 September 1920; sponsored by Miss Annette Rolph; and commissioned 19 April 1921.

After shakedown, Lamson was assigned to the Atlantic Fleet, arriving Charleston, South Carolina, 28 December 1921. From 1921 to 1925, the destroyer operated along the east coast and in the Caribbean, participating in fleet maneuvers, war games, and reserve training cruises.

Assigned to the U.S. Naval Forces in Europe, Lamson departed Boston, Massachusetts 18 June 1925 for operations in European and Mediterranean waters. Returning to the United States 1 year later, Lamson rejoined the Scouting Fleet and resumed exercises and maneuvers along the Atlantic coast and in the Caribbean.

Fate
The destroyer continued these operations until she decommissioned at Philadelphia 1 May 1930. Lamson was sold 17 January 1931 to Boston Iron & Metal Company, Baltimore, and scrapped 18 October 1934.

Notes

References

External links
http://www.navsource.org/archives/05/328.htm

 

Clemson-class destroyers
Ships built in San Francisco
1920 ships
Ships built by Union Iron Works